High School Reunion is a reality television series chronicling real-life high school reunions. Premiering on The WB on January 5, 2003 and airing for two seasons between 2003 and 2005, the series featured reunions of classes after ten years. Filmed in Maui, the series featured documentary-style interviews with the classmates, who are assigned "labels" to describe their high school roles.

A revived version of the series began airing on TV Land on March 5, 2008, focusing on the 20-year reunion of the 1987 graduating class of J. J. Pearce High School in Richardson, Texas. The series returned to TV Land in February 2009 with members of the Class of 1988 of Chandler High School in Chandler, Arizona reuniting and the promise that one of them would reveal a major secret. Once again class members had labels such as "The Class Clown", "The Cowboy", etc. The series returned with its third season premiering on January 13, 2010. It follows the members of the Class of 1989 of Chaparral High School in Las Vegas, Nevada.

Series overview

1987 classmates

Lana and Mike were married after high school, but they later divorced. After the break-up, Lana had an affair with one of Mike's friends, Steve. Lana said in the first episode she came to the reunion to make peace with Mike. Meanwhile, DeAnna and Justin, Sean and Kirstin, and others, develop feelings for each other.

 DeAnna, the popular girl
 Justin, the pipsqueak
 Kat, the lesbian
 Sean, the millionaire
 Cheryl, the outsider
 Jason, the bully
 Yvette, the girl next door
 Matt, the jock
 Heather, the heart-breaker
 Steve, the backstabber
 Kirstin, the spoiled girl
 Glenn, the geek
 Lana, the drama queen
 Mike, the rebel
 Rob, the stud

1988 classmates

 Andrew, The Band Geek
 Chad Ramirez, The Cowboy
 Dennis, The Troublemaker
 Heather, The Preacher's Daughter
 Jenny LaFlesch, The Cheerleader
 Jessica Frantz Garvin, The Ugly Duckling
 Kara Hoffman Breeze, The Homecoming Queen
 Liz, The Wannabe
 Lynette, The Snob
 Manny, The Player
 Maricela Vallecillo, The Outcast
 Octavia, The Flirt
 Renee, The Goody Goody
 Scott Horne, The Loner
 Scott Schutkowski, The Class Clown
 Scott White, The Skate Punk
 Shalonda Warren Clark, The Pregnant Girl
 Tom Breeze, The Jock
 Tyrone, The All-Star

1989 classmates 

 Antanus Pullum, The Ladies' Man
 Cyndi Ellis-Stueben, The Nerd
 Elena Machin, The Popular Girl (Summer Girl)
 Eric (Raven) Lowell, The Gay Guy
 Jodi McMillin Jorjorian, The Cheerleader
 Joe Basso, The Football Star
 John Mikolainis, The Troublemaker
 Justin Taggart, The Delinquent (Valley High)
 Lissette Jefferies-Waugh, The Hot Girl (Summer Girl)
 Lori Da Silva, The Party Girl
 Marcel Chevalier, The Prankster (Valley High)
 Mark Kasel, The Secret Admirer
 Rachelle Ramirez-Smith, The Late Bloomer
 Tracy Barkhuff, The Teacher's Pet
 Tracey Ealy, The Jock
 Treda Edwards Ealy, The Class Sweetheart

References

External links
 Official High School Reunion on TV Land (archived)

2003 American television series debuts
2010 American television series endings
2000s American high school television series
2010s American high school television series
2000s American reality television series
2010s American reality television series
English-language television shows
Television series by Warner Bros. Television Studios
Television shows set in Hawaii
TV Land original programming
The WB original programming
Television shows filmed in Hawaii
Television series by Warner Horizon Television